The Willcox Playa is a large endorheic dry lake or sink (playa) adjacent to Willcox, Arizona in Cochise County, in the southeast corner of the state. It is part of the Sonoran Desert ecoregion and is the remnant of a Pleistocene era pluvial Lake Cochise.  Portions of the dry lake bed have been used as a bombing range by the US military. Most of this area is currently used by the Electronic Proving Ground, based at Fort Huachuca. It was designated a National Natural Landmark in 1966 for its fossil pollen captured underground, the thousands of sandhill cranes that roost in the area and the largest diversity of tiger beetles in the United States.

The playa itself is roughly 8 miles wide by 10 miles long, with an area of approximately 40 square miles.

Location
The Willcox Playa is located in the northern region of Sulphur Springs Valley; drainage to the playa from the east is from the connected Dos Cabezas–Chiricahua Mountains; drainage from the southwest is from the Dragoon Mountains, and the Little Dragoon Mountains. During the summer, intense solar heating sometimes gives rise to large dust devils, and strong winds from thunderstorms and winter storms can produce dust storms rising from the dry lake that can hinder traffic on the Interstate 10 highway.

Willcox Playa Wildlife Area
In the vicinity of the dry lake is the Willcox Playa Wildlife Area administered by the Arizona Game and Fish Department. The location boasts rich wildlife, and hosts the annual January birding festival "Wings Over Willcox".

References

External links
 Willcox Playa Arizona Game and Fish Department
 Arizona Heritage Waters

Wildlife areas of Arizona
Protected areas of the Sonoran Desert
Landforms of Cochise County, Arizona
Endorheic basins of the United States
Protected areas of Cochise County, Arizona
National Natural Landmarks in Arizona